The 1972–73 season was the 74th season for FC Barcelona.

La Liga

League table

Results

References

External links

webdelcule.com

FC Barcelona seasons
Barcelona